RCE may refer to:

Arts, entertainment and media
 Red Chillies Entertainment, an Indian motion picture production and distribution company
 River City Extension, an American indie rock band

Business and organizations
 Radiation, Chemical and Environmental Hazards Directorate (RCE, formerly CRCE), part of the UK Health Security Agency (UKHSA)
 Regional Centres of Expertise, to promote education for sustainable development
 Rijksdienst voor het Cultureel Erfgoed, a Dutch state heritage organisation
 Roorkee College of Engineering, an engineering college in Uttarakhand, India
 Royal Canadian Engineers, a former administrative corps of the Canadian army

Economics and law
 Recursive competitive equilibrium, an economic concept
 Request for continued examination, a possible step in a patent application process
 Randomized controlled experiment (or randomized controlled trial), a type of scientific experiment or intervention study

Biology and medicine
 Ras converting enzyme, (see RCE1)
 Recurrent corneal erosion

Computing and electronics
 Region-code enhanced,  a type of DVD region code
 Remote code execution, a computer security vulnerability
 Remote component environment, a distributed, workflow-driven integration environment
 Reverse code engineering, reverse engineering of binary software

Other uses
 Registered Civil Engineer
 Redcar East railway station, England (National Rail station code RCE)
 Residential Customer Equivalent, a unit of measure for energy consumption
 Rooster Comb Extract, Used in the production of Hyaluronic Acid.